Katzen is a surname of German origin, which means "cats". It may refer to:

Daniel Katzen (born 1952), French horn player and teacher
Jay K. Katzen (born 1936), American diplomat
Lila Katzen (1925–1998), American sculptor
Mollie Katzen (born 1950), American chef and writer
Sally Katzen (born 1942), American legal scholar
Jeff Katzen
James A. Katzen (born 1974), American business executive
Katzen (performer)

Related names
Katz (surname)
Katzenbach (disambiguation)
Katzenellenbogen
Katzenelson
Katzenstein (disambiguation)
Katzman
Katzmann

See also
Katzen Arts Center, American University, Washington DC
Katzen Cancer Research Center, Washington DC
Katzensee, a lake in Zurich, Switzerland

Jewish surnames
Kohenitic surnames
German-language surnames
Yiddish-language surnames